Dominique Magnan (1731–1796), a learned French abbot of the Trinità dei Monti convent, of the order of the minims, in Rome, who was deeply involved in the intellectual life of his community during the second half of the 18th century.

Biography 
Dominique Magnan was born at Reillanne, in Provence, on May 29, 1731.

He studied at the University of Avignon, then joined the Minims of La Ciotat at age 20, where he began his career as a collector of ancient coins and medals. Appointed professor of theology in Marseille, he continued his work. He got in touch with the most famous antiquaries of the time, both in Italy and Germany, and speedily acquired an extensive reputation.

According to the nineteenth-century biographers, he was invited by Francis I to attend the Imperial Medal Cabinet. But results of recent research provide no evidence that it does. Neither in the archives of the Hofburg nor in published studies on Vienna Collections. We don't known why he ended up in Rome instead of Vienna but he lived for nearly thirty years in the old convent of Trinity.

True to a well-established tradition in the Minims, the Trinità dei Monti knew how to develop assets to participate in the Enlightenment debate. In the first place, a library. But they also did astronomy, botany, numismatics and published a lot. And Dominique Magnan was mainly the leader of this small group of religious. He had found here a good environment to undertake his scientific work.

His first books received critical acclaim. But his most significant works were on numismatics, though heavily criticized by specialists of the time in that universal and complete coverage of the subject could maintain confusion between authentic coins and the fake ones.

Having become treasurer of the convent, he had had to be accountable during the Apostolic Visit in 1794, which was fatal to him. Cardinal de Bernis directed that an inventory of his goods should be taken. About sixty in-folios in geography, numismatics, archeology were found, but also books of biblical scholarship, dictionaries and the Encyclopédie.

Asked to leave the Papal States in three days, he fled to Florence where he died in extreme misery in 1796.

Sources

References 

1731 births
1796 deaths
People from Provence
Deaths in Italy
French expatriates in Italy
Italian abbots
Minims (religious order)
French numismatists
French geographers
French cartographers
French archaeologists
French antiquarians
18th-century French historians
18th-century French male writers
18th-century French Catholic theologians